Bucheon is a city in Gyeonggi Province, South Korea. It is located between Incheon and Seoul.

Bucheon is the second most densely populated city in South Korea after Seoul, and as a result, administrative districts were abolished in July 2016 in favor of providing greater public service in community centers.

Major manufacturing operations are located in the northern areas of the city, while the areas in the south where Seoul Subway Line 7 and Seoul Subway Line 1 pass are dense commercial and residential areas.

Modern history 
In 1914, the outer areas of Incheon City (including Gwangyo-dong, old Incheon's city center) and Bupyeong County were joined under the name Bucheon. In 1931, Gyenam township (myeon, 계남면) was renamed Sosa township (myeon, 소사면). In 1936, the westernmost part of Bucheon, then part of old Incheon, was incorporated in Incheon City and in 1940 some other part of old Incheon belonging to Bucheon Country was incorporated in Incheon again while part of old Bupyeong was annexed to Incheon at the same time. In 1941, Sosa township promoted to eup (town) status.

On January 1, 1963, when the great expansion of Seoul was implemented, several districts were combined to Yeongdeungpo-gu (영등포구) of Seoul Metropolitan City as below.

In 1988, two districts were established. Bucheon was divided into Nam-gu ("south") and Jung-gu ("central") along the Seoul-Incheon trainline. Present day Sosa-gu was formerly called Nam-gu.

In 1993, Bucheon's Jung-gu was separated into two further districts, forming Wonmi and Ojeong Districts.

The three districts were abolished in July 2016 as Bucheon decided to become a unified city without any administrative districts.

Statistics

Arts and education 
Bucheon promotes itself as the cultural centre of the Seoul Metropolitan Area. The Bucheon Philharmonic Orchestra is located there, an annual international film festival is held in July called the Bucheon International Fantastic Film Festival or BiFan, and an annual international bboy competition called Bucheon Bboy International Championship (BBIC) held by Jinjo Crew since 2016.

Bucheon's institutions of higher education include: Bucheon College, Yuhan College, Catholic University of Korea Bucheon campus, and Seoul Theological University.

The city was designated "City of Literature" and has been a member of UNESCO Creative Cities Network since 2017.

Festival 

 Bucheon Aiins World festival - The miniature theme park Aiins World is hosting the World Nightview Fantasy Lighting Festival. There are famous buildings like the Eiffel Tower in France. The festival runs from 6 p.m. to 11 p.m. all year long, and is closed on rainy days. The last admission is at 10 p.m.
 Bucheon B-Boy International Championship (BBIC) - An international B-Boy competition held by world-famous B-Boy group Jinjo.

Shopping 
There are a number of markets in Bucheon, including the traditional market that runs along the south side of Bucheon Station, and a smaller traditional market that is located between Songnae Station and Jungdong Station.
Bucheon Station has an underground shopping center, a small Starbucks, and an E-Mart with a small Kyobo Book store on the top floor.

There are many department stores. In the Jung Dong area there is a Lotte Department store (formally GS Square) with a HomePlus located just across the street. On the Jung Dong and Sang Dong cusp there are a number of shopping places including the Hyundai Department Store, E-mart, and UPLEX (formally known as "The Mall"). UPLEX has a CGV movie cinema. The main Bucheon intercity bus terminal is attached to a shopping center called Newcore and it has a grocery store called Kim's Club located on the ground floor. There is also a movie cinema called Primus (프리머스) located in Newcore which is change into CGV nowadays. There is also a large HomePlus located beside Newcore with a Save Zone shopping center opposite it.

Songnae Station has a Toona Shopping Mall, which mostly sells clothing.
Yeokgok Station has a Homeplus.
There is also a Homeplus in Northern Bucheon, nearer to Bucheon Stadium.

Bars and restaurants 
The busiest areas for bars and restaurants are located by Bucheon Station, Lotte Department Store (formally GS Square), and Hyundai Department Store.

Climate 
Bucheon has a humid continental climate (Köppen: Dwa), but can be considered a borderline humid subtropical climate (Köppen: Cwa) using the  isotherm.

Transportation 

Bucheon has an extensive bus network of local and area buses that connect the city to Seoul, Incheon and other surrounding cities. Bucheon Bus Terminal has buses connecting to different cities and provinces throughout the country.  The Seoul Subway System Line 1 and Line 7 runs through Bucheon. There are currently five stations in Seoul Subway Line Line 1 within Bucheon City, including Bucheon Station and Songnae Station, and seven stations in the Line 7, including Kkachiul, Bucheon Stadium, Chunui, Sinjung-dong, Bucheon City Hall, and Sang-dong, which continues through Incheon ending at Bupyeong Station.

Bucheon has currently two subway lines under construction. The Sosa-Wonsi Line will open in 2018, connecting Bucheon's Sosa Station of the Line 1 with Ansan's Choji Station of Seoul Subway Line 4. The Daegok-Sosa Line will open in 2022, connecting with the Sosa-Wonsi Line as a single line. It will provide subway service in the northern area of Bucheon and connect the city to Gimpo International Airport Station where transfers to Seoul Subway Line 5, Seoul Subway Line 9, AREX and Gimpo Goldline will be available. The line terminates at Daegok station in Goyang, which offers a transfer to Seoul Subway Line 3 and Gyeongui-Jungang Line.

In addition, the city is getting a completely new subway line in the future which will connect Bucheon's northern Wonjeong area to Hongik University Station.

Religion 
There are a number of churches in Bucheon, including a Full Gospel Church near Lotte Department Store and the English-language "Bucheon Onnuri English Ministry" (BOEM) in Sang Dong. There is also a Church of Jesus Christ of Latter-day Saints located a short ways north of Bucheon Station. Evangelism and mission is a key expression of Christianity in the Bucheon churches. There is also Seogwangsa Temple, beside Weonmisan Mountain.

Notable people
Choi Sang-hyun, illustrator and character designer
Chu Ye-jin, actress
Baekhyun, singer and actor, member of boy band Exo
Kim Seol-hyun, singer and actress
Lee Hi, singer-songwriter
Kim Hee-jung, actress
Ryu Soo-young, actor
Moonbyul, singer-songwriter, rapper and dancer, member of girl group Mamamoo
Yuna Kim, retired figure skater and Olympic gold medallist
Sora Choi, fashion model
Katie Kim, singer
Bada, singer, composer, musical actress and television presenter
Jinho, singer-songwriter, member of boy band Pentagon
Song I-han, singer-songwriter
 Jo Gye-hyeon, singer and dancer, member of boy band VERIVERY
 Song Mingi, rapper and dancer, member of boy band ATEEZ

Sports 

Bucheon is home to the K League 2 football team Bucheon FC 1995 and the Women's Korean Basketball League women's basketball team Bucheon Hana 1Q.

See also 
 List of cities in South Korea
 Geography of South Korea
 Seoul National Capital Area

Twin towns – sister cities

Bucheon is twinned with:

 Bakersfield, United States (2006) 
 Harbin, China (1995)
 Khabarovsk, Russia (2002)
 Valenzuela, Philippines (2008)

Friendship cities
 Okayama, Japan (2002)
 Kawasaki, Japan (1996)
 Weihai, China (2000)

References

External links 
 City government website (in Korean)
  City government website (in English)
 Bucheon at Encyclopedia of Korean Local Culture

 
Cities in Gyeonggi Province